Jeremy Lane (born 1990) is an American football cornerback.

Jeremy Lane may also refer to:

 Jeremy Lane (writer) (1893–1963), writer of mystery and lost world short stories and novels

See also
Jerry Lane (disambiguation)
Jeremy Laing, Canadian fashion designer